Nana Akua Amotemaa-Appiah (born July 1971) is a British television presenter for GB News.

Early life
The child of Ghanaian immigrants, Akua was born in Newcastle upon Tyne. Her family moved to the United States when she was 11 years old.

She studied business and finance at university.

Career
Akua used to work for the radio stations Kiss 100, Capital Radio, the Chelsea and Westminster Hospital radio station and BBC Three Counties Radio. 

On television, Akua worked as a presenter for Bid-Up.TV and Price Drop, later working for the BBC on Look East and Holiday. She also appeared as a panellist on Good Morning Britain on ITV and Jeremy Vine on Channel 5, as well as being a contributor to a Panorama programme dealing with mortgage scammers. She later worked as a continuity announcer for the BBC.

She formerly presented Tonight Live with Nana Akua on GB News and said that GB News was "striking a chord" with the British public when speaking to Sky News Australia.

Personal views
Akua worked with the Department of Health and Social Care to encourage black, Asian and minority ethnic (BAME) people to be vaccinated against COVID-19, and called GB News co-host Darren McCaffrey a "hypocrite" live on-air for opposing compulsory vaccinations against COVID-19 for staff in care homes, despite him taking a vaccine against yellow fever when travelling abroad.

Akua has criticised "taking the knee" against racism as an example of virtue signalling. Akua has linked it to Black Lives Matter (BLM), which she calls a "far-left Marxist pressure group and political organisation" and has supported England football fans who did not agree with the gesture of taking the knee, but said that booing is bad manners.

References

Living people
People from Newcastle upon Tyne
British political commentators
GB News newsreaders and journalists
1971 births
Black British women
English people of Ghanaian descent